2004–05 Hong Kong FA Cup was the 31st staging of the Hong Kong FA Cup. The cup was won by Sun Hei, who won 2-1 against Happy Valley in the final.

The competition started on 28 April 2005 with 9 Hong Kong First Division clubs. Although most of the matches were held in Mongkok Stadium, the final was held in Hong Kong Stadium on 22 April 2005.

The competition was officially known as Xiangxue Pharmaceutical FA Cup 2004/2005 due to sponsorship from Xiangxue Pharmaceutical Factory Co Ltd.

Teams
 Buler Rangers
 Citizen
 Fukien
 Happy Valley
 Kitchee
 South China
 Sun Hei
 Sunray Cave
 Xiangxue Pharmaceutical

Fixtures and results
All times are Hong Kong Time (UTC+8).

Bracket

Note *: Fukien beat Xiangxue Pharmaceutical by 1-0 in the preliminary round.

Preliminary round

Quarter-finals

Semi-finals

Final

Goalscorers

Prizes

Team awards
 Champion (HK$80,000): Sun Hei
 1st Runners-up (HK$20,000): Happy Valley
 Knock-out in the semifinals (2 teams) (HK$10,000 each): Kitchee, Sunray Cave
 Knock-out in the Preliminary (5 teams) (HK$5,000 each): Buler Rangers, Citizen, Fukien,  South China, Xiangxue Pharmaceutical

Individual awards
 Top Scorer Award (HK$5,000):  Oliveira (Happy Valley)
 Best Defender Award (HK$5,000):  Cordeiro (Sun Hei) and  Lee Wai Man (Happy Valley)

References

External links

2004-05
2005 domestic association football cups
FA Cup